The Nixon Doctrine (also known as the Guam Doctrine) was put forth during a press conference in Guam on July 25, 1969, by President of the United States Richard Nixon and later formalized in his speech on Vietnamization of the Vietnam War on November 3, 1969. According to Gregg Brazinsky, author of "Nation Building in South Korea: Koreans, Americans, and the Making of a Democracy", Nixon stated that "the United States would assist in the defense and developments of allies and friends", but would not "undertake all the defense of the free nations of the world." This doctrine meant that each ally nation was in charge of its own security in general, but the United States would act as a nuclear umbrella when requested. The Doctrine argued for the pursuit of peace through a partnership with American allies.

Background
At the time of President Nixon's first inauguration in January 1969, the US had been engaged in combat in Vietnam for almost four years. The war had so far killed over 30,000 Americans and several hundred thousand Vietnamese citizens. By 1969, US public opinion had moved decisively to favoring ending the Vietnam War; a Gallup poll in May showed 56% of the public believed sending troops to Vietnam was a mistake. Of those over 50 years old, 61% expressed that belief, compared to 49% of those between ages 21 and 29, even if tacit abandonment of the SEATO Treaty was ultimately required and caused a complete communist takeover of South Vietnam despite previous US guarantees. Because Nixon campaigned for "Peace with Honor" in relation to Vietnam during the 1968 presidential campaign, ending the Vietnam War became an important policy goal for him.

The Nixon Doctrine
During a stopover during an international tour on the U.S. Territory of Guam, Nixon formally announced the Doctrine. Nixon declared the United States would honor all of its treaty commitments in Asia, but "as far as the problems of international security are concerned ... the United States is going to encourage and has a right to expect that this problem will increasingly be handled by, and the responsibility for it taken by, the Asian nations themselves".

Later, from the Oval Office in an address to the nation on the War in Vietnam on November 3, 1969, Nixon said:First, the United States will keep all of its treaty commitments.
Second, we shall provide a shield if a nuclear power threatens the freedom of a nation allied with us or of a nation whose survival we consider vital to our security.
Third, in cases involving other types of aggression, we shall furnish military and economic assistance when requested in accordance with our treaty commitments. But we shall look to the nation directly threatened to assume the primary responsibility of providing the manpower for its defense.

Doctrine in practice

The Doctrine was exemplified by the Vietnamization process regarding South Vietnam and the Vietnam War.  It also played elsewhere in Asia including Iran,  Taiwan, Cambodia,  and South Korea.  The doctrine was an explicit rejection of the practice that sent 500,000 American soldiers to Vietnam, even though there was no treaty obligation to that country.  A major long-term goal was to reduce the tension between the United States and the Soviet Union and mainland China, so as to better enable the policy of détente to work.

The particular Asian nation the Nixon Doctrine was aimed at with its message that Asian nations should be responsible for defending themselves was South Vietnam, but Shah Mohammad Reza Pahlavi of Iran seized upon the Nixon Doctrine with its message that Asian nations should be responsible for their own defense to argue that the Americans should sell him arms without limitations, a suggestion that Nixon eagerly embraced. The US turned to Saudi Arabia and Iran as "twin pillars" of regional stability. Oil price increases in 1970 and 1971 would allow funding both states with this military expansion. Total arms transfers from the United States to Iran increased from $103.6 million in 1970 to $552.7 million in 1972; those to Saudi Arabia increased from $15.8 million in 1970 to $312.4 million in 1972. The United States would maintain its small naval force of three ships in the Gulf, stationed since World War II in Bahrain, but would take on no other formal security commitments.

One factor in reducing open-ended American commitments was financial concern.  Vietnam had proven very expensive.  In South Korea, 20,000 of the 61,000 US troops stationed there were withdrawn by June 1971.

The application of the Nixon Doctrine "opened the floodgates" of US military aid to allies in the Persian Gulf.  That in turn helped set the stage for the Carter Doctrine and for the subsequent direct US military involvement of the Gulf War and the Iraq War.

Contemporary usage
Scholar Walter Ladwig argued in 2012 that the United States should adopt a "neo-Nixon doctrine" towards the Indian Ocean region, in which the US would sponsor key local partners—India, Indonesia, Australia and South Africa—to assume the primary burden for upholding regional peace and security. A key shortcoming of the original Nixon Doctrine, Ladwig argues, was its reliance on pro-Western autocrats who proved to be a poor foundation for an enduring regional security structure. In contrast, his "neo-Nixon Doctrine" would focus on cultivating the major Indian Ocean nations that are democratic and financially capable of being net providers of security in the region. Although crediting this idea for the "reasonable balance it strikes between US leadership and local initiative", Andrew Philips of the Australian Strategic Policy Institute has suggested the idea overstates "the degree of convergent security interests between its four presumptive sub-regional lynchpin states."

References

Further reading
 Chua, Daniel Wei Boon. (2014) "Becoming a “Good Nixon Doctrine country”: Political relations between the United States and Singapore during the Nixon presidency." Australian Journal of Politics & History 60.4 (2014): 534-548. 
 
 Komine, Yukinori. (2014) "Whither a 'Resurgent Japan': The Nixon Doctrine and Japan's Defense Build-up, 1969–1976." Journal of Cold War Studies 16.3 (2014): 88-128.
 Litwak, Robert S. Détente and the Nixon doctrine: American foreign policy and the pursuit of stability, 1969-1976 (CUP Archive, 1986).
 Meiertöns, H.  (2010): The Doctrines of US Security Policy — An Evaluation under International Law, Cambridge University Press, .
 Nam, Joo-Hong, and Chu-Hong Nam. (1986) America's commitment to South Korea: the first decade of the Nixon doctrine (Cambridge UP, 1986).
 Pauker, Guy J., et al. (1973) In search of self-reliance: US security assistance to the Third World under the Nixon Doctrine (RAND Corp. 1973). online
 Ravenal, Earl C. (1971) "The Nixon doctrine and our Asian commitments." Foreign Affairs 49.2 (1971): 201-217. online
 Trager, Frank N. (1972) "The Nixon Doctrine and Asian Policy." Southeast Asian Perspectives 6 (1972): 1-34. online

Primary sources

External links
 Video and transcript of Richard Nixon's Address to the Nation on the War in Vietnam, November 3, 1969 from the Richard Nixon Presidential Library and Museum
 

Vietnam War
History of the foreign relations of the United States
Presidency of Richard Nixon
1969 in the United States
1969 in international relations
Foreign policy doctrines of the United States
July 1969 events in the United States